Year 1310 (MCCCX) was a common year starting on Thursday (link will display the full calendar) of the Julian calendar.

Events

By place

Europe 
 Spring – Siege of Algeciras: Castilian forces led by King Ferdinand IV (the Summoned) abandon the siege after 6 months (see 1309) and begin negotiations with Granada. Ferdinand and Sultan Abu al-Juyush Nasr sign a peace treaty for 7 years on May 26. Nasr agrees to pay an indemnity of 150,000 gold doblas and an annual tribute of 11,000 doblas to Castile. He yields some frontier towns, including Quesada and Bedmar. In accordance with the terms, Nasr becomes a vassal of Castile and provides up to 3 months of military service per year if summoned. Markets will be opened between Castile and Granada – Ferdinand appoints a judge of the frontiers (juez de la frontera) to adjudicate disputes between Christians and Muslims in the border regions.
 May 12 – In France, 54 members of the Knights Templar are burned at the stake for heresy at Paris, on orders of King Philip IV (the Fair). Pope Clement V attempts to take control of the situation by issuing a papal bull, to assert the Church's authority over the matter and demands Philip turn over the Templars and their property to ecclesiastical officials, who will then try the Templars for charges themselves.
 June 14 – Leading Venetian nobles led by Bajamonte Tiepolo organise a conspiracy against Doge Pietro Gradenigo. Their plot fails due to treachery and the rebels are defeated near Piazza San Marco by forces faithful to the doge on June 15. During their retreat to the San Polo sestiere, the Rialto Bridge is burnt down. Later, Tiepolo surrenders himself and is exiled to Istria.
 July – The Council of Ten (or simply the Ten) is created by Pietro Gradenigo. The council, the inner circle of oligarchical patricians, is created to investigate the plot of Bajamonte Tiepolo.
 Summer – Count Charles of Valois founds the Diocese of Corfu, Zakynthos and Cephalonia with its seat in Corfu. It is, comprising the Ionian Islands of Corfu, Zakynthos and Cephalonia.

England 
 September – King Edward II invades Scotland, but the campaign is fruitless, even though English forces under Piers Gaveston manage to reach as far north as Perth.

Asia 
 Spring – Siege of Warangal: Delhi forces led by Malik Kafur conquer the fortress of Warangal after a month-long siege. Rudradeva II, Indian ruler of the Kakatiya Dynasty, negotiates a truce and surrenders a huge amount of wealth to send to the Delhi Sultanate.

By topic

Education 
 The first purpose-built accommodation for students (the Mob Quad) is completed at Merton College, Oxford, England.
</onlyinclude>

Births 
 March 5 – Przecław of Pogorzela, Polish bishop (d. 1376)
 April 30 – Casimir III (the Great), king of Poland (d. 1368)
 November 29 – John de Mowbray, English nobleman (d. 1361)
 November 30 – Frederick II, German nobleman (d. 1349)
 Berenguer de Cruïlles, Spanish abbot and bishop (d. 1362)
 Dermot MacCarthy, Irish nobleman and magnate (d. 1367)
 Gil Álvarez Carrillo de Albornoz, Spanish cardinal (d. 1367)
 Guillaume Tirel (or Taillevent), French head chef (d. 1395)
 Jean de Beaumanoir, Breton nobleman and knight (d. 1366)
 Margaret I, French noblewoman (House of Capet) (d. 1382)
 Niccolò Acciaioli, Italian nobleman and seneschal (d. 1365)
 Simon Langham, English cardinal and archbishop (d. 1376)
 Urban V, French pope of the Catholic Church (d. 1370)

Deaths 
 February 11 – Marguerite d'Oingt, French nun (b. 1240)
 April 10 – Peire Autier, French religious leader (b. 1245)
 April 13 – Athinkhaya, Burmese ruler and regent (b. 1261)
 April 15 – Baybars II, Egyptian ruler and regent (b. 1250)
 April 26 – Constance of Montcada, French noblewoman 
 May 20 – John  de Moels, English nobleman and knight
 May 22 – Humilitas of Vallombrosa, Italian nun (b. 1226)
 May 25 – Otto III, Austrian nobleman (House of Gorizia)
 June 1 – Marguerite Porete, French mystic and author
 June 5 – Amalric of Tyre, Cypriot prince and statesman
 October 1 – Beatrice of Burgundy, French noblewoman
 October 14 – Blanche of Anjou, queen consort of Aragon 
 October 28 – Athanasius I, Byzantine patriarch (b. 1230)
 October 29 – Otto of Cleves, German nobleman (b. 1278)
 November 23 – Abu al-Rabi Sulayman, Moroccan ruler 
 December 10 – Stephen I, German nobleman (b. 1271)
 Abu al-Barakat al-Nasafi, Syrian scholar and theologian
 Alexander MacDougall, Scottish nobleman and magnate
 Constantine I (or III), co-ruler of Cilician Armenia (b. 1278)
 Dai Biaoyuan, Chinese literateur, poet and writer (b. 1244)
 Diego López V de Haro, Spanish nobleman and knight
 Erik Eriksøn (Longlegs), Danish nobleman and co-ruler
 Gao Kegong (or Fang Shan), Chinese painter (b. 1248)
 Geoffrey I, Luxemburgian nobleman (House of Vianden)
 George Pachymeres, Byzantine historian and theologian
 Gottfried von Hohenlohe, German Grand Master (b. 1265)
 Guido I da Polenta, Italian nobleman and chief magistrate
 Henry II Kőszegi (or III), Hungarian nobleman and knight
 John de Soules, Scottish nobleman (House of de Soules)
 Robert FitzRoger, English nobleman and knight (b. 1247)
 Tommaso degli Stefani, Italian painter and artist (b. 1231)

References